Václav Machek (27 December 1925 – 1 November 2017) was a Czech cyclist who competed for Czechoslovakia. He took part in the 1956 Summer Olympics, winning a silver medal in the tandem event.

References

External links
 
 

1925 births
2017 deaths
Czech male cyclists
Olympic cyclists of Czechoslovakia
Cyclists at the 1956 Summer Olympics
Olympic silver medalists for Czechoslovakia
Olympic medalists in cycling
Medalists at the 1956 Summer Olympics
People from Pardubice District